Carl Oliver Zandén (born 14 August 2001) is a Swedish professional footballer who plays as a left-back for  club Toulouse.

Club career
Born in Alingsås, Västergötland, Zandén started his career at hometown club Gerdskens BK, before joining the youth ranks of Elfsborg in 2016 at the age of 15. During the time in the club's youth system, he played in the UEFA Youth League.

On 19 July 2022, Zandén signed with Toulouse in France.

References

External links
 

2001 births
Living people
Swedish footballers
Association football defenders
Sweden youth international footballers
Allsvenskan players
Ligue 1 players
IF Elfsborg players
Toulouse FC players
Swedish expatriate footballers
Swedish expatriate sportspeople in France
Expatriate footballers in France